Pachyphasma is a genus of insects in the family Mantophasmatidae. It is a monotypic genus consisting of the species Pachyphasma brandbergense.

Pachyphasma brandbergense is endemic to the Brandberg Massif of Namibia.

References

Mantophasmatidae
Monotypic insect genera
Insects of Namibia
Endemic fauna of Namibia